Mary Davies may refer to:

Arts and entertainment
Mary Davies (mezzo-soprano) (1855–1930), Welsh singer
Mary Davies (poet) (1846–1882), Welsh poet
Mary Bridget Davies (born 1978), American singer and actress
Mary Ignatius Davies (1921–2003), Sister of Mercy and music teacher

Literature
Mary Carolyn Davies (1888–?), American writer 
Mary Davies (writer) from 16th Lambda Literary Awards

Sports
Mary Davies (athlete), represented New Zealand at the 2009 World Championships in Athletics
Mary Davies (lawn bowler), Welsh lawn bowler
Mary Elizabeth Davies, Welsh chess player

Others
Mary Davies Wilburn (1883–1987), longest-lived survivor of the sinking of the RMS Titanic
Mary Davies (heiress), wife of Sir Thomas Grosvenor, 3rd Baronet

See also
Mary Davis (disambiguation)